The U.S. state of California first required its residents to register their motor vehicles in 1905. Registrants provided their own license plates for display until 1914, when the state began to issue plates. Plates are currently issued by the California Department of Motor Vehicles.

Front and rear plates are required on most types of vehicle in California, including all passenger vehicles. On motorcycles and some other non-passenger types, only rear plates are required. On all vehicle types, registration validation stickers are also required, to be displayed on the rear plate.

Since 1947, California license plates have been manufactured by inmates at Folsom State Prison.

Passenger baseplates

Pre-state plates

1914 to 1962
The 1955 (dated 1956) issue was the first California license plate that complied with these standards.

1963 to present
All plates from 1963 until present are still valid, provided they are displayed on the vehicle to which they were originally issued and the vehicle has been continuously registered. Along with the pre-1963 plates above, these plates can be used for the year-of-manufacture program, with appropriate year sticker.

The current 1ABC123 serial format was introduced in 1980. In this format, the ABC123 portion of the serial progresses from AAA000 to ZZZ999, before the leading digit advances by one and the progression begins again. All letters are used, although I, O and Q are only used as the second letter (third digit). Series 1SWD000 through 1TZZ999 and 1WAA000-1YZZ999 have not been issued, while others have been reserved for non-passenger and optional plates, such as 1ZZA through 1ZZZ and 3ZZA through 3ZZG for Livery plates, and 1UAA through 1VZZ for Lake Tahoe, Yosemite and Coastal Protection ("Whale Tail") plates.

It is expected that when 9ZZZ999 is reached, the next serial format will be 123ABC1, maintaining the DMV's practice since the 1960s of reversing serial formats at exhaustion.

Non-passenger plates

Occupational plates
On each occupational plate type, the full-size number is constant for each distributing entity, while the small suffix (or prefix on the Special Equipment Dealer/Manufacturer plate) varies. Only rear plates are required for each type.

Legislative plates

Stickers

Optional types (specialty plates)

See the Passenger Baseplates section above for the 1982–87 "Golden State" plate, which was briefly issued as the standard passenger base.

Year-of-manufacture plates

The use of year-of-manufacture (YOM) plates is authorized by Section 5004.1 of the California Motor Vehicle Code. It is a law that allows vintage cars to be registered to use vintage license plates. Any officially manufactured California license plates which were produced prior to 1963 can be used on a currently registered vehicle or trailer of a corresponding model year. If used on the original plate, a sticker or metal tab that corresponds to the year of the vehicle is required.

In July 2009, California extended its YOM program to include passenger vehicles from 1963 to 1969, and commercial vehicles (pick-ups, etc.) through 1972. Any black-and-gold plate from this era may be used on these vehicles, as long as they are "clear" with the DMV (i.e., not used, reported stolen, or any records found, for the last 10 years). A valid sticker must be attached to the plate corresponding to the year of the vehicle that is to be registered.

, in very rare cases, California has extended custom license plates to allow more than seven digits, but not to exceed nine characters. However, most plates are limited to seven-and-a-half characters (the half-character is a half-space).

In August 2016, California extended the year-of-manufacture license plate program to include vehicles through the 1980 model year.

California Legacy License Plate program
The California Legacy License Plate program offers vehicle owners the opportunity to purchase replicas of California license plates similar to those issued in the 1960s. California proposed issuing plates similar to those of the 1950s, 1960s and 1970s. The original plan was to restrict the plate colors to what would have been issued to the vehicle when purchased new.  After a few months, the program was opened to all model years.  Only the 1960s (gold on black) plate reached the required 7,500 minimum orders before January 1, 2015. The 1950s (black on gold) and 1970s (gold on blue) plates did not achieve the required 7,500 minimum orders. The plates were issued from late spring through summer 2015 and, as of 2021, are still available for order from the DMV website. Additional time is required for personalized plates.

Temporary license plates

Prior to 2019, California was the last U.S. state to not require the display of any form of temporary license plate on new vehicles. New motor vehicle dealers were still required to electronically report sales of new vehicles to the DMV, but they were only required to print out a DMV report-of-sale form on regular paper at the time of sale. The dealer was then only required to attach the DMV report-of-sale form to the inside of the car windshield in the lower right corner (from the driver's perspective).  Before 2019, it was common for a newly purchased vehicle to be driven around for a month (or more) with nothing but a dealer's advertisement or logo on paper plate inserts in the mounting brackets where the owner was supposed to promptly install front and rear license plates when they arrived in the mail from the DMV.

California's lack of a temporary license plate requirement was mocked as the "Steve Jobs loophole," due to the Apple founder's habit of continuously signing a series of six-month leases of Mercedes-Benz SL55 AMGs on a rolling basis for the specific purpose of avoiding the state requirement of having to install permanent license plates on his cars. The DMV report-of-sale forms were printed in regular type not intended to be read at a distance, meaning that it was legible only to persons leaning closely over the windshield when the car was standing still. This made the new vehicle untraceable through casual visual observation by passerby (especially for the common car models and colors), as well as automated means such as license-plate reading systems, red light cameras, and automatic number plate recognition.  Thus, drivers of newly purchased vehicles who deliberately failed to carry a FasTrak electronic toll collection transponder could evade toll collection (on tolled Express Lanes, toll bridges, and toll roads where a transponder system was used instead of toll booths), causing the state to lose $15–19 million per year.  Vehicle owners who failed to immediately attach permanent metal license plates upon receipt might eventually get cited one way or another for that infraction, but there was no way at that point to retroactively link such vehicle owners to unpaid tolls. This loophole was also deliberately exploited by criminals, who knew that a car with dealer paper inserts was untraceable and in and of itself would not raise suspicion.

The hit-and-run death of a pedestrian who was struck by an unidentifiable car with dealer paper inserts sparked the enactment of new legislation in 2016 to require temporary license plates in California beginning in 2019. The DMV's reporting system was modified to enable dealers to print out temporary license plates on special paper, and dealers are now required to attach such temporary paper plates to a vehicle that does not already have license plates. The series that the temporary license plates use is AB12C34, and it will apply to all newly purchased vehicles in the state of California starting in 2019.

References

Sources
 CA Department of Motor Vehicles License Plate Introduction
 Other types of Specialty Plates
 California License Plate Data (1914–1962)
 Special Recognition Plates
 Legacy Plates

External links

 California license plates, 1969–present
 Photo library of California license plates

Road transportation in California
California
California transportation-related lists